Young-jin, also spelled Young-jean or Yeong-jin, is a Korean given name, that is a unisex name. It was the sixth-most-popular name for South Korean newborn boys in 1960, falling to tenth place by 1970. Its meaning depends on the hanja used to write each syllable of the name. There are 34 hanja with the reading "young" and 43 hanja with the reading "jin" on the South Korean government's official list of hanja which may be registered for use in given names.

People
People with this name include:

Entertainers
 Yoo Young-jin (born 1971), South Korean male pop singer-songwriter and executive of SM Entertainment
 Lee Young-jin (actress) (born 1981), South Korean actress

Sportspeople
 Lee Young-jin (footballer, born 1963), South Korea male football manager and former player
 Lee Young-jin (footballer, born 1972), South Korea male football coach and former player
 Kim Young-jin (born 1984), South Korean male field hockey player
 Suk Young-jin (born 1990), South Korean male bobsledder

Other
 Young Jin Cho (born 1946), South Korean-born American Methodist bishop
 Choi Young-jin (born 1948), South Korean male United Nations official
 Young Jean Lee (born 1974), South Korean-born American female playwright

See also 
 List of Korean given names
 Jin-young, also a Korean given name; the same syllables in reverse order

References

Korean unisex given names